Wenceslao Fernández Flórez (1885 in A Coruña, Galicia – 1964 in Madrid) was a popular Galician journalist and novelist of the early 20th century. Throughout his career, he retained an intense fondness for the land of his birth.

Early life and career 

His father died when he was fifteen years old, forcing Wenceslao to abandon his education and dedicate himself to journalism. His first job was with A Coruña's La Mañana, and he went on to write for El Heraldo de Galicia, Diario de A Coruña and Tierra Gallega. At the age of eighteen he was given a senior position at Diario Ferrolano. He later returned to A Coruña to work at El Noroeste.

He kept close friendship with Galician nationalism leaders and other intellectuals . Among his friends we find: Manuel Maria Puga and Parga -Picadillo-, Carré brothers, Tettamanci, Manuel Casas, Angel Castillo and others. All of them were older than him, but who really makes a huge impression in his way of thinking was Castelao, which was one of the most frequently illustrators for his works.

Work in Madrid and novels 

In 1914 Flórez moved to Madrid, where he worked at El Imparcial and Diario ABC, where he started the parliamentary column Acotaciones de un oyente. He had begun writing novels - La tristeza de la paz (1910), La procesión de los días (1915) and Luz de luna (1915), and Volvoreta (1917).

In translation
 The Seven Pillars; translated by Sir Peter Chalmers Mitchell, London, Macmillan and co.,ltd., (1934), 288 p.
 Seduced. In:

Works

The sadness of Peace (1910)
The procession of Days (1914)
Moonlighting (1915)
Dimensioning of a listener (Parliamentary Chronicles, 1916)
Volvoreta (1917), adapted into a film by José Antonio Nieves Conde in 1976
The Devil's Eye (1918)
Entered a Thief (1922)
Vulgar tragedies of life (1922), an anthology of short stories
Bluebeard's Secret (1923)
Visions of neurasthenia (1924)
Women's Footsteps (1924)
The seven columns (1926)
Immoral Story (1927)
The man who wanted to kill (1929), adapted for the screen by Rafael Gil in 1942 with Antonio Casal ( The man who wanted to kill and again by Rafael Gil in 1970 with Tony Leblanc ( The* man who wanted to kill )
Artificial Ghosts (1930), an anthology of short stories
Those who did not go to war (1930)
The evil Carabel (1931), adapted into a film by Edgar Neville in 1935, by Fernando Fernan Gomez in 1956 and Rafael Baledón in 1962
The man who bought a car (1932)
Knight Adventures Rogelio Amaral (1933)
An island in the Red Sea (1938)
The novel number 13 (1941)
The Living Forest (1943), adapted into a film by Joseph Neches in 1945, by José Luis Cuerda in 1987 written by Rafael Azcona and Angel de la Cruz and Manolo Gomez in 2001
The bull, the bullfighter and the Cat (1946)
Pelegrin system (1949)
Fireworks (1954)
Goalkeeper in goal (1957)

External links
 

1885 births
1964 deaths
People from A Coruña
Spanish male novelists
Members of the Royal Spanish Academy
Writers from Galicia (Spain)
20th-century Spanish male writers
20th-century Spanish novelists
20th-century Spanish journalists
Male journalists